Gray's School of Art is the Robert Gordon University's art school, located in Aberdeen, Scotland. It is one of the oldest established fine art institutions in Scotland and one of Scotland's five art schools today, and ranked among the Top 20 Schools of Art and Design in the United Kingdom. The School is housed in a modernist building at the university's Garthdee campus in Aberdeen. As well as degree-level training in fine art, applied art and design, Gray's School of Art offers short courses and evening classes to the general public in a wide variety of mediums. Many of these are designed for those with no previous formal training, and can also be used to develop a portfolio prior to applying for degree-level study. The School also mounts exhibitions, including the annual Degree Show which showcases the work of students on its programmes.

History

Gray's was founded in 1885 as Gray's School of Science and Art, in recognition of the generosity of its founding father, John Gray (1811–1891), a local businessman and philanthropist. He began as a carpenter but rose through the ranks to become a partner in McKinnon & Co., a firm of engineers and iron founders in Aberdeen. In 1859 he was appointed director of the Aberdeen Mechanics Institution, one of the city institutions which would eventually develop into The Robert Gordon University.

In the early 1880s, John Gray offered to finance a new school of science and art in Aberdeen, on the condition that the governors named it Gray's School of Science and Art. His offer stemmed partly from the difficulties he himself had experienced obtaining adequate training. The school opened in 1885 with 96 students enrolled for the day classes and 322 for the evening classes. It was housed in an impressive pink granite building at Schoolhill in the city centre, next to the Aberdeen Art Gallery. The building was designed to match and give architectural coherence to the gallery, in accordance with Gray's wishes. By the 1960s the School had outgrown the building, and moved to a newly constructed modernist building at Garthdee, next to the Scott Sutherland School of Architecture (see below). The original building still stands at Schoolhill and is currently (year 2020) home to the technology enterprise support centre of a business and economic support organisation.

Garthdee Campus

In the early 1950s, Tom Scott Sutherland (1899–1963), an Aberdeen architect who had attended the School of Architecture at Robert Gordon's Technical College, gifted his Victorian mansion of Garthdee House and its surrounding estate on the southern outskirts of Aberdeen, to the School of Architecture, along with a substantial endowment. The relocated school opened at Garthdee in 1956 as the Scott Sutherland School of Architecture.

Following on from this development, in 1966 Gray's School of Art was relocated to a Modernist building on the Garthdee Estate, which marked the beginning of the redevelopment of Garthdee by Robert Gordon's Institute of Technology (the institution which would develop into The Robert Gordon University). The Gray's School of Art building has three floors and is designed in a U-plan with a large front facade and two wings. The current building was designed by Michael Shewan and was influenced by the Illinois Institute of Technology campus (particularly the S. R. Crown Hall) designed by the celebrated American modernist architect Ludwig Mies van der Rohe. It is one of the 60 DoCoMoMo Key Scottish Monuments, a list of notable Scottish post-war buildings selected as significant examples of architectural style, building materials and location. It consists of a three-storey main block with single-storey wings to each side, which surround a quadrangle covered with grass and a small pond. The building is supported by an external steel skeleton which permits floor-to-ceiling windows for its numerous studios and workshops. These facilities include studios for painting and drawing, printmaking, photography, ceramics, jewellery, 3D design, as well as computer labs, life model changing rooms, two large open-plan sculpture studios, a canteen and art shop. A temporary extension encloses the southern side of the quadrangle, added in the 1990s to ease a shortage of space in the art school.

The ground floor on the main facade houses the printmaking studios and workshops as well as administrative offices, a computer lab, photocopiers and textile-printing workshops. The East Wing houses a photographic studio, the school art shop, refectory and the large First Year Studio Hall. The West Wing houses ceramics, jewellery and 3D design workshops as well as life model changing rooms and two large open-plan sculpture studios. Both wings have only one floor, although underneath the sculpture and first year studios, which are built into the hill on which the school stands, there are two general woodwork and metalwork workshops.

The first floor houses second and third year painting studios, visual communication studios, textiles studios, life drawing rooms, the head of school's office in the east wing and the printmaking staff room in the west. The second floor until recently exclusively housed the fourth year painting studios. However, in the last two years two rooms have been reallocated to the new photography and electronic media (PEM) course.

Gray's School of Art also has some studios in the adjacent Scott Sutherland (School of Architecture and Built Environment) building where the studios for Communication Design are housed. Many facilities such as workshops and computing facilities are shared between the two schools. The temporary extension at the south side of the quadrangle, added in the 1990s, houses 3D design studios, design-for-industry studios, facilities for critical and contextual studies, and studios for the Master of Fine Arts (MFA) programme.

Future expansion
As part of the Robert Gordon University's development of the Garthdee Campus, which aims to move all of the University's facilities to Garthdee by 2015, Gray's School of Art is earmarked for relocation to a more central part of the Garthdee campus in a new purpose-built building. The Scott Sutherland School of Architecture has already been relocated to its new location on campus and its old building renamed Garthdee Annexe. Final plans for both the existing and the new building are still unclear and very little information is available.

Areas of study
Gray's offers training in a wide range of fine art, applied art and design disciplines. All courses employ a general first year where students study elements of each subject area as a "taster", before choosing an area of specialism from second year to graduation.

Design Courses
BA (Hons) Communication Design
BA (Hons) Fashion and Textile Design
BA (Hons) Three Dimensional Design

Fine Art Courses
BA (Hons) Contemporary Art Practice
BA (Hons) Painting

Degree-Link Course
BA (Hons) Commercial Photography

Postgraduate Programmes
MFA/MDES in Contextualised Practice
Masters of Research in Art and Design
MPhil/PhD Research in Art and Design

Degree Show
Gray's holds an annual Degree Show in June to publicly showcase the work of its students. The opening night is a significant social event for the students, staff and the local arts community. The Degree Show always runs head to head with the Glasgow School of Art and Edinburgh College of Art Degree Shows.

Notable alumni 

 Tako Taal, Welsh-Gambian artist & filmmaker.
 Mary McMurtrie, Scottish botanical artist & horticulturalist.

References

External links
Gray's School of Art

Art schools in Scotland
Robert Gordon University